Lord Peter Wimsey is a series of television serial adaptations of five Lord Peter Wimsey novels by Dorothy L. Sayers starring Ian Carmichael broadcast on BBC One between 1972 and 1975, beginning with Clouds of Witness in April 1972.

Cast
Ian Carmichael as Lord Peter Wimsey
Glyn Houston as Mervyn Bunter (Clouds of Witness, The Nine Tailors, Five Red Herrings)
Derek Newark as Mervyn Bunter (The Unpleasantness at the Bellona Club)
Mark Eden as Inspector Charles Parker (Clouds of Witness, The Unpleasantness at the Bellona Club, Murder Must Advertise, The Nine Tailors)
Rachel Herbert as Lady Mary Wimsey (Clouds of Witness, Murder Must Advertise)

Production
The adaptations star Ian Carmichael as aristocratic sleuth Lord Peter Wimsey, the second son of the Duke of Denver. Not wanting for money, charm or intelligence, Wimsey takes up detective work as an amateur pursuit, using his connections and social status to assist the police in their investigations.

Carmichael played the role concurrently in a series of BBC Radio 4 adaptations from 1973, which eventually completed the whole sequence of Sayers's novels. In The Radio Detectives (1999), Carmichael recalls that he had hoped to continue with further television adaptations, but acknowledged that by 1975 he was too old to play the part onscreen for the sequence of more romantic novels featuring crime writer Harriet Vane. He felt that as a result of a technician strike, production of the fifth adaptation under a new producer, Bill Sellars, was not as successful, after which the series was not renewed. (Three later television adaptations of the Harriet Vane stories were produced as A Dorothy L. Sayers Mystery with Edward Petherbridge as Wimsey in 1987.)

Glyn Houston played Wimsey's loyal valet and assistant Mervyn Bunter in three adaptations and Derek Newark in The Unpleasantness at the Bellona Club (the character does not appear in Murder Must Advertise). Mark Eden played Inspector Charles Parker, Lord Peter's friend and contact at Scotland Yard in three adaptations.

The series was recorded in the then-standard format of videotape for studio sequences (recorded at Television Centre, London and Pebble Mill Birmingham from the second serial) and 16mm film for exterior location scenes. Locations included St Peter's Church, Walpole St Peter and Terrington St John, Norfolk for The Nine Tailors and Kirkcudbright, Galloway in Scotland for The Five Red Herrings, the latter almost entirely shot on film due to a technician strike, with only a few studio sequences taped in studios in Glasgow.

The 1930s-style theme tune was written by Herbert Chappell. The BBC record of Herbert Chappell's theme tune featured a second track "Size Ten Shuffle" which in re-arranged form was used as the theme for FilmFair's adaptation of Paddington Bear (1976–1980).

Episodes

References

External links

1972 British television series debuts
1975 British television series endings
BBC television dramas
English-language television shows
1970s British drama television series
Period television series
British crime drama television series
BBC mystery television shows
Television series set in the 1930s
British detective television series